

564001–564100 

|-bgcolor=#f2f2f2
| colspan=4 align=center | 
|}

564101–564200 

|-bgcolor=#f2f2f2
| colspan=4 align=center | 
|}

564201–564300 

|-id=280
| 564280 Tudorica ||  || Alexandru Tudorică (born 1987) is a Romanian astronomer and science communicator whose research includes globular clusters and Solar System astronomy with the European Near Earth Asteroids Research. He obtained his PhD from the with a His thesis at the University of Bonn was about the magnification effects of weak gravitational lensing. || 
|}

564301–564400 

|-bgcolor=#f2f2f2
| colspan=4 align=center | 
|}

564401–564500 

|-bgcolor=#f2f2f2
| colspan=4 align=center | 
|}

564501–564600 

|-bgcolor=#f2f2f2
| colspan=4 align=center | 
|}

564601–564700 

|-bgcolor=#f2f2f2
| colspan=4 align=center | 
|}

564701–564800 

|-bgcolor=#f2f2f2
| colspan=4 align=center | 
|}

564801–564900 

|-bgcolor=#f2f2f2
| colspan=4 align=center | 
|}

564901–565000 

|-bgcolor=#f2f2f2
| colspan=4 align=center | 
|}

References 

564001-565000